was a Japanese aristocrat (kuge), courtier, and statesman of the Nara period. He was the son of sadaijin Tachibana no Moroe and the second head of the Tachibana clan.

He was the leader of a plot to replace Fujiwara no Nakamaro and to overthrow Empress Kōken (Tachibana no Naramaro's Conspiracy). It was not successful.

Early life 

In 749, Emperor Shōmu retired, and Empress Kōken assumed the throne. Fujiwara no Nakamaro, who had both the favor of Kōken and the confidence of Shōmu's wife Empress Kōmyō, rapidly rose to power, and came into conflict with Moroe.

In 755, Moroe was reported to have slandered the court at a banquet. He resigned in the next year, and died disappointed in 757.

In 756, ex-Emperor Shōmu died, and based on his will  was made crown prince. In 757, though, Kōken removed him from the position on the grounds of immorality, and two months later replaced him with Nakamaro's preferred candidate Prince Ōi, the future Emperor Junnin.

Conspiracy and capture 

Another month later, Naramaro was made  within the Daijō-kan. Naramaro was extremely unhappy with Nakamaro's monopolization of power, and together with a group including  and Ono no Azumabito, plotted to remove Nakamaro. Naramaro held meetings and secretly tried to recruit sympathizers, but the plot was leaked.  informed Nakamaro that Naramaro and company were preparing weapons.

On July 26, 757,  revealed that Ono no Azumabito had approached him to request his participation in Naramaro's plot, and Azumabito was arrested and interrogated. Tortured by caning, Azumabito confessed everything. The plan had been for Naramaro to raise troops and kill Nakamaro, then make the crown prince resign. Stealing the emperor's seal and station bells, they would leave Fujiwara no Toyonari in power over the country, make the Emperor resign, and choose a more sympathetic prince as the new emperor.

Interrogated by Fujiwara no Nagate, Naramaro said that because the government was wicked, he planned to raise troops and make a petition. When Nagate asked why the government was wicked, Naramaro responded that the government was constructing temples like Tōdai-ji while the people suffered. Nagate replied that Tōdai-ji was constructed in the time of Naramaro's own father, and Naramaro had no answer to that. According to 's confession, Naramaro first began to plot a rebellion when Emperor Shōmu made an imperial visit to Namba in 745, and invited Matanari to participate at that time. After his interrogation, Matanari committed suicide.

Aftermath 

Although the punishment for the conspirators would normally have been death, Empress Kōken decreed that they should be spared this highest punishment and exiled instead. However, Nakamaro wanted to establish the firm rule of law, and did not relent. Azumabito, who had already confessed, was treated the same. After hours of this torture, the victims died in prison. Naramaro's fate is not recorded in the Shoku Nihongi, but he is assumed to have died in the same way. However, Naramaro's name continues to appear in the Shoku Nihongi after the conspiracy's exposure, so this theory is also problematic.

Ironically, after Naramaro's death, his son Kiyotomo was born, and Kiyotomo's daughter Kachiko bore Emperor Saga the future Emperor Ninmyō. Meanwhile, Naramaro's opponent Nakamaro himself rebelled and was defeated. In 847, Naramaro was posthumously granted the ranks his old enemy had been stripped of:  and daijō-daijin.

Genealogy 

Father: Tachibana no Moroe
Mother: , daughter of Fujiwara no Fuhito
Wife: from the ?
Eldest son: 
Wife: daughter of Ōtomo no Koshibi
Son: 
Wife: daughter of Fujiwara no Umakai?
Son: 
Wife: daughter of 
Son: 
Unknown wife:
Son:

Notes

References
 Nussbaum, Louis-Frédéric and Käthe Roth. (2005).  Japan encyclopedia. Cambridge: Harvard University Press. ;  OCLC 58053128

721 births
757 deaths
People of Nara-period Japan